was a Japanese bureaucrat, politician and cabinet minister in Taishō and early Shōwa period Japan.

Early life
Minami was born as Iwama Tetsuro, the younger son of a wealthy farming family in Himi, Toyama, who had served for three generations in the Toyama prefectural assembly. He graduated from Tokyo Imperial University with a legal degree and passed his civil service examinations in 1896. Afterwards, he married the eldest daughter of Minami Heikichi, the chairman of the Toyama Prefectural Assembly, and changed his name to Minami Hiroshi.

After serving in several posts within the Prime Minister’s office and the Home Ministry, Minami was appointed Chief Cabinet Secretary under the 1st Saionji administration in 1908, and served in that post again from 1911 to 1912. In December 1912, he was appointed to a seat in the House of Peers. From 1913 to 1914, he was appointed governor of Fukuoka Prefecture. In 1918, he was appointed Undersecretary for Education.

On 2 March 1932, Minami became Governor-General of Taiwan, but served in that post for less than three months before being replaced on 26 May, following the May 15 Incident to become Communications Minister in the Saito administration. He was the first cabinet minister to have been appointed from Toyama Prefecture, and served in this post for two years and two months.

In 1937, Minami proposed that a new cabinet-level ministry be created, separating out the health care and social insurance / pensions portions of the Home Ministry. This “Ministry of Welfare” (the predecessor of the modern Ministry of Health, Labour, and Welfare) was realized in 1938, and Minami is credited with coining the kanji used in its name.

In 1943, Minami served as chairman of the National Language Council, a government body established to standardize the Tōyō kanji and Modern kana usage to simplify education. He was also a member of the Privy Council, where he earned the enmity of the military by his outspoken remarks against Japanese militarism.

Minami died of carbon monoxide poisoning on 8 February 1946 while in the middle of a meeting.

References

External links

1869 births
1946 deaths
Governors of Fukuoka Prefecture
University of Tokyo alumni
Government ministers of Japan
People from Toyama Prefecture
Governors-General of Taiwan
Members of the House of Peers (Japan)
Deaths from carbon monoxide poisoning